SOS United is a 1989 charity album, produced to raise money for the SOS Children's Villages organisation. The album features the singing of children from different countries. Also included are guest performances by musicians Chris Thompson (of Manfred Mann's Earth Band) and Tom Waits.

Track listing

References

Charity albums
1989 albums